is a Japanese manga series by Tetsurō Sayama and Chizuru Takahashi which was serialized by Kodansha from December 1979 (January issue 1980) to July 1980 (August issue 1980) in the shōjo manga magazine Nakayoshi. The manga was collected in two volumes published under the KC Nakayoshi imprint.

Studio Ghibli adapted the manga into a 2011 film directed by Gorō Miyazaki, with a script co-written by the director's father, Hayao, and Keiko Niwa, co-author of the scripts for The Secret World of Arrietty (2010) and Tales from Earthsea (2006).

Kokuriko is the Japanese transliteration of "coquelicot" – French for "corn poppy".

Plot
The manga is set in the late 1960s in Yokohama, Japan; the Ghibli film is set in 1963.  The main character, Umi Komatsuzaki, is a high school girl who has to grow up quickly when her father goes missing.

Studio Ghibli film

Studio Ghibli announced on December 15, 2010, that it would be adapting the manga for its 2011 summer release film. The staff announced for the film include Gorō Miyazaki as the director, with a screenplay by Hayao Miyazaki and Keiko Niwa, and music composed by Satoshi Takebe.

Aoi Teshima, who played the role of Theru and sang the theme song in the 2006 Ghibli film Tales from Earthsea would also sing the theme song for this film. Toshio Suzuki was to produce Kokurikozaka kara, to be distributed domestically by Toho.

In the film adaptation, Umi's family name is shortened to Matsuzaki.

References

External links
 

1980 manga
Historical anime and manga
Kodansha manga
Yokohama

es:Kokurikozaka kara
ru:Kokuriko-Zaka Kara